Brianna Lynn Brown (born October 2, 1979) is an American actress and producer. She is known for her television roles as Lisa Niles in the ABC soap opera General Hospital, and as Taylor Stappord in the Lifetime series Devious Maids.

Life
Brown was born in Saint Paul, Minnesota and grew up in the Twin Cities suburb of Apple Valley. She briefly attended St. Olaf College before moving to Los Angeles when she was 19.

Brown married film director Richie Keen near Santa Barbara in May 2017. In March 2018, it was reported that the couple was expecting their first child; Brown gave birth to a son in July 2018.

Career
Brown made her first on-screen appearance in 1999 in an episode of NBC series Freaks and Geeks, and in later years acted in many films and television series. On television, she guest starred in CSI: Crime Scene Investigation, Smallville, Entourage, Without a Trace, The Closer, Joey, and Criminal Minds. She has played the lead roles in the horror films Night of the Living Dead 3D (2006) and Timber Falls (2007). Brown also co-starred in horror film The Lost Tribe and the Judd Apatow comedies The 40-Year-Old Virgin and Knocked Up.

From 2010 to 2011, Brown portrayed Lisa Niles in ABC daytime soap opera General Hospital. Later in 2011, she played Lynne Reed in the Showtime thriller series Homeland. In 2012, Brown was cast in a series regular role in the first season of the prime time comedy-drama series Devious Maids. Her character was written out after season one, but returned for the series' third season. In 2014, Brown was cast as regular in ABC drama pilot The Whispers opposite Lily Rabe and Milo Ventimiglia. On June 11, 2014, it was announced that Brown had left The Whispers and that her role would be recast. She later went to appear on Revenge, The Mentalist, Graceland, and NCIS: New Orleans.

In 2017, Brown was cast as Claudia Blaisdel in The CW television series Dynasty, a reboot of the 1980s series of the same name.

Filmography

Film

Television

Awards and nominations

References

External links
 Brianna Brown official website
 

Living people
American film actresses
American television actresses
Actresses from Saint Paul, Minnesota
American soap opera actresses
20th-century American actresses
21st-century American actresses
St. Olaf College alumni
People from Apple Valley, Minnesota
1979 births
Apple Valley High School (Minnesota) alumni